Matthew Haynes (born 1984) is a British and English retired track cyclist.

Cycling career
Haynes is a two time British champion winning the Time Trial Championship, at the 2004 British National Track Championships and the Tandem Championships at the 2009 British National Track Championships with Bruce Croall.

References

1984 births
Living people
British male cyclists
British track cyclists